Packera clevelandii is an uncommon species of flowering plant in the aster family known by the common name Cleveland's ragwort. It is endemic to California, where it is known from only two small regions, a section of the North Coast Ranges around Napa County and a part of the Sierra Nevada foothills on the opposite side of the Sacramento Valley. The plant grows in shrubby chaparral on serpentine soils.

It is a perennial herb producing one or more erect stems from a taproot and caudex unit, reaching up to a meter in maximum height. The leaves are thick and fleshy, and have a waxy coating. Their blades are up to 10 centimeters long at the base of the plant, and smaller farther up.

The inflorescence contains several flower heads, each lined with green- or purple-tipped phyllaries (flower bract). The head contains many golden yellow disc florets and 8 to 13 narrow yellow ray florets each under a centimeter long.

References

External links
Jepson Manual Treatment
USDA Plants Profile
Flora of North America
Photo gallery

clevelandii
Endemic flora of California
Flora of the Sierra Nevada (United States)
Natural history of the California chaparral and woodlands
Taxa named by Edward Lee Greene
Flora without expected TNC conservation status